Elections to South Lanarkshire Council were held on 6 April 1995, the same day as the other mainland Scottish local government elections.

In the first election since its creation (from the Clydesdale, East Kilbride and Hamilton districts plus four wards of the Glasgow district, all under the Strathclyde region in the previous two-tier system of local government), South Lanarkshire's new administration was placed under Scottish Labour Party control after they won over 80% of the 73 wards.

Aggregate results

Ward results

Rutherglen and Cambuslang

Notes

See also
1992 Clydesdale District Council election
1992 East Kilbride District Council election
1992 City of Glasgow District Council election
1992 Hamilton District Council election
1994 Strathclyde Regional Council election

References

1995 Scottish local elections
1995